Alan Greaves  (born 1969, Otley, West Yorkshire) is a lecturer at the University of Liverpool, UK, who specialises in the Bronze and Iron Ages of Anatolia.

Career
In 2005 he was made a National Teaching Fellow by the UK Higher Education Academy.

In 2017 he was made a Principal Fellow of the Higher Education Academy in recognition of his advocacy of LGBT inclusion in British universities.

Representative Publications
Alan M Greaves. (2002). Miletos: A History, London: Routledge. 
A. Fletcher and A. Greaves (eds.) (2007). Transanatolia, (Anatolian Studies 57). BIAA.
Alan M Greaves. (2010). The Land of Ionia: Society and Economy in the Archaic Period, Wiley-Blackwell. 
Alan M Greaves (2015). John Garstang's Footsteps across Anatolia, Koc University Press.

Tours
He leads archaeological tours for Peter Sommer Travels.

References

External links
Peter Sommer Travels

1969 births
Living people
British archaeologists
People from Otley
Academics of the University of Liverpool
Alumni of Grey College, Durham
Principal Fellows of the Higher Education Academy